Dina parva is an annelid in the Erpobdellidae family.

References

Leeches
Animals described in 1912